Lost Jewlry is the twelfth mixtape by American rapper and Wu-Tang Clan member Raekwon. It was released on January 15, 2013 for free. The mixtape features guest appearances from Faith Evans, Freddie Gibbs, Altrina Renee and Maino, and includes production from Scram Jones, Buckwild and more. It was released in promotion of his forthcoming studio album, F.I.L.A. (Fly International Luxurious Art).

Background 
In 2012, Raekwon launched his own record label, Ice H2O Records. He announced on November 30, 2012, that he will soon release an EP titled Lost Jewlry. On December 20, he released the first single titled, "Never Can Say Goodbye". However the single did not make the final cut. The mixtape was originally scheduled to be released on January 8, 2013, but was later pushed back until January 15, 2013. The music video for "Came Up" was released on January 16, 2013. On March 14, 2013, an extended/remix version of "86'" was released featuring a verse from rapper AZ. A video was released the same day.

Track listing

References 

Raekwon albums
Hip hop EPs
Albums produced by Scram Jones
Albums produced by Buckwild
2013 albums
2013 mixtape albums